The  was the principal officers' training school for the Imperial Japanese Army Air Service. The classrooms of the academy were located in the city of Sayama, Saitama Prefecture, northwest of Tokyo. An airfield was added in 1937 and used by the IJAAS until 1945.

Post War Use
From 1945 to 1962 it was used by the USAF as Johnson Air Base, Japan Air Self-Defense Force began use of the base in 1958 and last US forces left in 1978.

The former airfield of the academy is now Iruma Air Base of the Japan Air Self-Defense Force.

Superintendents
Major General Hayashi Kinoshita：October 1, 1937 
Major General Shozo Teraguchi：July 1, 1939 
Lieutenant General Hayashi Kinoshita：September 15, 1941 
Major General Saburo Endo：December 1, 1942 
Lieutenant General Michio Sugawara：May 1, 1943 
Lieutenant General Yoshitoshi Tokugawa：March 28, 1944

Notable alumni
(IJA: Imperial Japanese Army, JGSDF: Japan Ground Self-Defense Force, JASDF: Japan Air Self-Defense Force)

 Seiroku Kajiyama：Liberal Democratic Party Politician
 General Osamu Namatame：IJA and JASDF Officer,
 Captain Isamu Kashiide：IJA
 General Shigehiro Mori：IJA and JASDF Officer, Chief of Staff, Joint Staff
 General Goro Takeda：IJA and JASDF Officer, Chief of Staff, Joint Staff
 General Motoharu Shirakawa：IJA and JASDF Officer, Chief of Staff, Joint Staff
 Captain Yoshio Yoshida：IJA aviator, flying ace during WW2
 General Kanshi Ishikawa：IJA and JASDF Officer
 General Morio Nakamura：IJA and JGSDF
 Takuma Yamamoto：Computer Engineer, Businessmen, Vice Chairman of Nippon Kaigi, Order of the British Empire
 Tadashi Itagaki：Liberal Democratic Party Politician, Senior Adviser of Japan War-Bereaved Families Association, son of General Seishiro Itagaki
 Major General Yasuhiko Kuroe：IJA and JASDF Officer

Ramesh Sakharam Benegal：Indian Airforce Air Commodore

See also
Imperial Japanese Army Academy
Tokyo Boys
F Kikan

Military history of Japan
Imperial Japanese Army
Japanese Air Force
Defunct Japanese military academies
1945 disestablishments in Japan